David Faust was the seventh president of Cincinnati Christian University. He is now the Associate Minister at East 91st Street Christian Church in Indianapolis, Indiana, where he previously served as the Senior Minister from 1999 to 2002.

Publications

Since 1996 he has written a weekly column for The Lookout, a weekly magazine for Christian families. He has also written or co-authored 16 books including Unquenchable Faith, Married for Good, Faith Under Fire, Embracing the Truth, The Life of Moses, Monday Morning Prayers, Monday Morning Prayers, and Honest Questions/Honest Answers.

Leadership

He served in the ministry or on the university faculty since the late 1970s, becoming president in 2002 and serving for 12 years. He also received two degrees from the university when it was called Cincinnati Bible Seminary. He was the President of the 2006 North American Christian Convention.

Personal life

He has been married to his wife Candy, a registered nurse, since 1975.

References

Living people
American members of the Churches of Christ
Heads of universities and colleges in the United States
Kentucky Christian University alumni
Fuller Theological Seminary alumni
Cincinnati Christian University
1955 births